Quatre Bornes  also known as La Ville des Fleurs (The City of Flowers), is a town in Mauritius, located in the Plaines Wilhems District, the western part also lies in the Rivière Noire District. The town is administered by the Municipal Council of Quatre Bornes. Situated between the towns of Beau-Bassin Rose-Hill and Vacoas-Phoenix, Quatre Bornes is linked by roads to the north, east, south and west of Mauritius. According to the census made by Statistics Mauritius in 2015, the population of the town was at 77,308.

History
In 1721, Wilhem Leicknig of Prussian origin settled on the island then known as Isle de France, the district of Plaines Wilhems was named after him. In 1740, French cartographer Guyomar drew the "Quartiers des Plaines Wilhems" where Quatre Bornes was shown as a forest which was slowly being colonised. Joseph François Charpentier de Cossigny named his region Palma and Governor Antoine Desforges Boucher named his region Bassin in 1764. During the British period, the railway line was introduced in 1864, the region of Plaines-Wilhems started developed rapidly with the migration of people from coastal regions. Quatre Bornes was proclaimed a village in 1890, then proclaimed "Town" under Governor Harman in 1896. The Bassin and Palma state was annexed to the Town of Quatre Bornes in 1967. In 1987, the region of La source was annexed to the town of Quatre Bornes. In the 1980s and 1990s, a period of rapid commercial development started.

Politics
For the general elections the town is classified within the Constituency No.18 Belle Rose and Quatre Bornes. For several past general elections the Nomination Centre has been located within Baichoo Madhoo Government School.

Education

Schools in Quatre Bornes include 12 secondary schools and 9 primary schools which are either state owned or private institutions.

Secondary institutions include the College Sainte-Marie, Collège du Saint-Esprit, Dr. Regis Chaperon State Secondary School, Eden College Boys, Eden College Girls, Gaëtan Raynal State College, Islamic Cultural College, Loreto College Quatre Bornes, Palma State Secondary School, Patten College Boys, Quatre Bornes State Secondary School and Sodnac State Secondary School.

Primary schools include Baichoo Madhoo Government School, Emilienne Rochecouste Government School (GS), Beau Séjour GS, Candos GS, Louis Nellan GS, Palma GS, Remy Ollier GS, Chooroomoney GS, Sir Veerasamy Ringadoo GS and Sookun Gaya GS.

Sports

The town is home to the Guy Rozemont Football Stadium, the team of the town is the AS Quatre Bornes, it currently plays in the National First Division for the 2012–2013 season.

Suburbs
The town of Quatre Bornes is divided into different regions.

 Bassin
 Belle Rose
 Berthaud
 Candos
 Centre Ville
 Ébène
 Bassin
 La Louise
 Residence Kennedy
 La Source
 Palma
 Pellegrin
 Pierrefonds
 Sodnac
 St Jean
 Trianon
 Vieux Quatre Bornes

Twin towns – sister cities

Quatre Bornes is twinned with:
 Ambalavao, Madagascar
 Daqing, China
 Saint-Benoît, Réunion, France

See also

 List of places in Mauritius

References